The 2013 Copa Latina is the fifth edition of the annual women's volleyball tournament, organized by the Peruvian Volleyball Federation and Frecuencia Latina, played by four countries from May 9–12, 2013 in Coliseo Eduardo Dibos, Lima, Peru.

This was the first edition of the Cup to be FIVB-recognized.

Purpose
The organizers called the cup a 'Revenge Cup' for the top 4 teams at the 2013 Junior Pan-American Cup, with its main purpose to be a preparation for the 2013 FIVB Women's Junior World Championship.

 send the national junior team (U20) as preparation for the 2013 FIVB Women's Junior World Championship.
 send the national junior team (U20) as preparation for the 2013 FIVB Women's Junior World Championship.
 send the national junior team (U20) as preparation for the 2013 FIVB Women's Junior World Championship.
 send the national junior team (U20) as preparation for the 2013 FIVB Women's Junior World Championship.

Preliminary round
This edition of the tournament featured a round-robin system of matches, if the teams in the top two places will play for the gold medal and the teams in third and fourth places for the bronze medal.

Final round

3rd place match

Final

Final standing

Individual awards

Most Valuable Player

Best Scorers (tied)

Best Spiker

Best Blocker

Best Server

Best Digger

Best Setter

Best Receiver

Best Libero

References

Copa Latina
Voll
Volleyball